Riker or Ryker is a given name and surname of Dutch origin and is a cognate of Richard.

Persons with the surname
 Robin Riker (born 1952), American actress and book author
 Tim Riker (born 1963), software programmer and maintainer of BZFlag
 William H. Riker (1920–1993), American political scientist
 William E. Riker (1873–1969), cult leader
 Andrew L. Riker (1868–1930), American automobile designer and engineer
 John Lafayette Riker (1822–1862), American Civil War Officer
 Richard Riker (1773–1842), New York politician
 Tom Riker (born 1950), American former professional basketball player
 James Riker (1822-1889), New York historian and genealogist
 Philip Riker (born 1946), American former competition swimmer
 Samuel Riker (1743-1823), New York politician
 Albert Joyce Riker (1894-1982), American plant pathologist
 David Riker, American screenwriter and film director
 John Riker (died 2019), former American manager and truck driver better known by the name Ralphus for WCW

In fiction

 William T. Riker, a fictional character in the Star Trek franchise
 Kyle Riker, father to the fictional William Riker
 Thomas Riker, a fictional twin of William Riker in Star Trek franchise
 Vortex Rikers, a fictional prison spacecraft in the Unreal franchise
John Ryker, fictional enemy of the Hulk in Marvel comics

Persons with the given name
 Riker Lynch, bassist born in Littleton, Colorado
 Riker Hylton, Jamaican sprinter

Other
 Riker (TV series), an American television series
 Rikers Island, in New York
 Can-Am Ryker, a three-wheeled motorcycle

See also